Evans Landing may refer to:

 Evans Landing, Indiana
 Evans Landing, Queensland